Mikko Innanen (born 8 September 1982) is a Finnish football midfielder who currently plays for JJK in Finland.

References

1982 births
Living people
Finnish footballers
Finland B international footballers
Veikkausliiga players
FC Haka players
Myllykosken Pallo −47 players
Association football forwards
Footballers from Tampere